

Canada 

 List of Ford political family members
 List of Layton family members
 List of Trudeau family members

United States 

 List of Bush family members
 List of Clinton family members
 List of Kennedy family members
 List of Trump family members

Lists of lists of people